Naseib Obaid Sebait Araidat is a paralympic athlete from United Arab Emirates competing mainly in category T52 sprint events.

Naseib competed in all three sprint events at the 2000 Summer Paralympics in Sydney, Australia.  He won a silver medal in the T52 400m.

References

External links
 

Paralympic athletes of the United Arab Emirates
Athletes (track and field) at the 2000 Summer Paralympics
Paralympic silver medalists for the United Arab Emirates
Emirati wheelchair racers
Living people
Year of birth missing (living people)
Medalists at the 2000 Summer Paralympics
Paralympic medalists in athletics (track and field)